Larry Lujack (born Larry Lee Blankenburg; June 6, 1940 – December 18, 2013), also called Superjock, Lawrence of Chicago, Uncle Lar, and King of the Corn Belt, was a Top 40 music radio disc jockey who was well known for his world-weary sarcastic style. Some of his more popular routines included Klunk Letter of the Day, the darkly humorous Animal Stories with sidekick Tommy Edwards as Little Tommy, and the Cheap Trashy Show Biz Report.

Professional life

Lujack came to Chicago to work for WCFL-AM.  He spent a few months there before being hired at WLS.  While at WCFL, Lujack closed the air studio curtains during public visiting hours.
 
His Animal Stories routine came about because WLS was still receiving farm magazines long after the station changed to a rock-music format in 1960. Lujack started reading some of them and began airing stories from them instead of reading the grain reports connected with the Farm Report.  When the Farm Report was officially discontinued, the feature became Animal Stories. A perfectionist about his work, Lujack would review every word he spoke on the air after each broadcast by listening to an audio cassette skimmer tape which recorded only when the microphone was open.

Lujack retired in 1987, shortly after his son John from his first marriage died in an accident.  In 1997, Lujack moved from Palatine, Illinois to the outskirts of Santa Fe, New Mexico and, in May 2000, began working again, for then-WUBT (WKSC-FM) in Chicago, via a remote Integrated Services Digital Network (ISDN) link from a New Mexico recording studio, teaming up with Matt McCann who was based in the Chicago studio. The ratings for the show out-paced the rest of the radio station.  In 2003, he reteamed with his Animal Stories partner, Tommy Edwards (Little "Snot-Nosed" Tommy), on WRLL (1690 AM) in Chicago, to broadcast his signature features on weekday mornings. On August 16, 2006, Lujack was terminated with the entire WRLL on-air staff as it was announced that the station's Real Oldies format would cease on September 17, 2006.  The broadcast duo were on the air once again as part of the WLS "The Big 89 Rewind" on Memorial Day, 2007 and 2008 when the station returned to its MusicRadio programming, featuring many of the former WLS personalities and special guests, other DJs, etc.

Lujack was inducted into the Illinois Broadcasters Association's Hall of Fame in June 2002, the National Radio Hall of Fame on November 6, 2004, and the National Association of Broadcasters Hall of Fame on April 15, 2008, during their annual convention in Las Vegas.

Personal life
Born in Quasqueton, Iowa  as Larry Lee Blankenburg, the family moved to Caldwell, Idaho when he was 13. He later changed his last name to that of his football idol, Johnny Lujack. He attended the College of Idaho in Caldwell, Idaho, and Washington State University and was a radio disc jockey, starting in 1958, at KCID in Caldwell. His entry into radio while a biology major at College of Idaho was a matter of finances; at the time he was looking for a part-time job. He originally intended to go into wildlife conservation. He subsequently worked at several other radio stations, including KJR (AM) in Seattle, but is best known for his antics on Chicago AM radio stations WLS and WCFL.

Lujack had three children from his first marriage and a stepson from his second. 

Away from the job, he was a golf enthusiast. After triple coronary artery bypass surgery in 1991, Lujack marked his calendar for the date his doctor told him he could return to the sport. Not just a "fair weather" golfer, Lujack suited up in winter clothing and snowshoes to play Chicago area golf courses in winter. On January 23, 1985, he played a full 18 holes at Buffalo Grove, Illinois; the temperature was 27 degrees below zero with a windchill of -75 degrees. Lujack collapsed afterward.

Lujack died December 18, 2013 at a Santa Fe, New Mexico hospice of esophageal cancer.

Radio stations

Works

References

External links

 
 Scott Childers' The History of WLS Radio The Rock of Chicago, the 1980s. Read about Lujack in the context of WLS history.

audio file-Reel Radio "The Legendary Lujack" Composite

audio file of Lujack's first day on the job at WLS-1967
 Real Oldies 1690 AM WRLL. Through Sept. 17, 2006, hear an automated version of the station where Lujack and Tommy Edwards (Little Tommy of Animal Stories) hosted mornings from October 2003 through August 15, 2006.

1940 births
2013 deaths
People from Buchanan County, Iowa
American radio DJs
College of Idaho alumni
Radio personalities from Chicago
People from Palatine, Illinois
People from Santa Fe, New Mexico
People from Spokane, Washington
Washington State University alumni
Deaths from esophageal cancer